Penaeus esculentus (the brown tiger prawn, common tiger prawn or tiger prawn) is a species of prawn which is widely fished for consumption around Australia.

Ecology

Distribution
There is little population structure in the species, with only slight differentiation between regions east and west of the Pleistocene land bridge between Australia and New Guinea.

Fisheries and aquaculture
Around  of brown tiger prawns are caught each year. Fisheries in Torres Strait are worth around A$24 million per year. It is closely related to Penaeus monodon, with which it can hybridise. It has the potential to be used in aquaculture (shrimp farming) since, although it grows less rapidly than P. monodon, it commands higher prices.

Taxonomic history
William Aitcheson Haswell arrived in Australia in 1878, and began working in a marine zoology laboratory at Watsons Bay. In 1879, he described Penaeus esculentus in a paper in the Proceedings of the Linnean Society of New South Wales, basing his description on material in the Macleay Museum which had come from Port Jackson and Port Darwin, and noting that P. esculentus is "the common edible prawn of Sydney, and Newcastle, etc.".

References

Penaeidae
Crustaceans described in 1879
Edible crustaceans
Commercial crustaceans
Taxa named by William Aitcheson Haswell